Primero de Mayo is Spanish for the First of May. It may refer to:

 Primero de Mayo Bay (now known as Fumarole Bay), Deception Island, South Shetland Islands, Antarctica
 Primero de Mayo Department, Chaco Province, Argentina
 Primero de Mayo, Entre Ríos, village and municipality in Argentina
 Primero de Mayo (Los Mangos), settlement in Pueblo Viejo Municipality, Veracruz, Mexico
 , a major road in Bogotá, Colombia
 ARA Primero de Mayo, first Argentine exploration ship in the Melchior Islands, Antarctica
 Club Primero de Mayo, Bolivian football club from Trinidad, Beni, promoted in the 2008 Copa Simón Bolívar
 , football club in Guaranda, Bolívar Province, Ecuador
 Grupo Primero de Mayo, anti-Franco resistance movement in Spain

See also 
 May 1st (disambiguation)